Tatlı (also, Tatlu and Tatly) is a village and municipality in the Agstafa Rayon of Azerbaijan.  It has a population of 2,765.  The municipality consists of the villages of Tatlı, Köhnəqışlaq, and Yaradullu.

References 

Populated places in Aghstafa District